Majerthrips is a monotypic genus of thrips in the family Phlaeothripidae. The only species is Majerthrips barrowi.

References

Phlaeothripidae
Thrips genera
Monotypic insect genera